Künzing is a municipality in the district of Deggendorf, Bavaria, Germany.

References

Deggendorf (district)